The 2021 Old Dominion Monarchs baseball team represented Old Dominion University in the sport of baseball for the 2021 college baseball season. The Monarchs competed in Division I of the National Collegiate Athletic Association (NCAA) and in Conference USA East Division. They played their home games at Bud Metheny Baseball Complex, on the university's Norfolk campus. The team was coached by Chris Finwood, who was in his tenth season with the Monarchs.

Preseason

C-USA media poll
The Conference USA preseason poll was released on February 11, 2021, with the Monarchs predicted to finish in second place in the East Division.

Preseason All-CUSA team
Hunter Gregory – Starting Pitcher

Schedule and results

Schedule Source:
*Rankings are based on the team's current ranking in the D1Baseball poll.

Columbia Regional

Rankings

References

External links
•	Old Dominion Baseball

Old Dominion
Old Dominion Monarchs baseball seasons
Old Dominion Monarchs baseball
Old Dominion